Pythium oligandrum is an oomycete.  It is a parasite of many fungi and other oomycetes including Botrytis, Fusarium and Phytophthora. It has been licensed as a biocontrol agent in the form of an oospore soil treatment, which reduces pathogen load and concomitant plant disease. P. oligandrum have been found to express several genes belonging to the CAZy-family when feeding on prey. P. oligandrum can grow within the roots of certain plants, including tomato and sugar beet. Production of auxin-like substances stimulate plant growth. Defense responses can be induced in the plant, which primes the plant from further infection by pathogenic fungi, oomycetes or bacteria.

Toxicology
UC IPM provides an automated tool to evaluate the ecotoxicology risk of the use of P. oligandrum.

References

 Brožová, J. Exploitation of the mycoparasitic fungus Pythium oligandrum in plant protection. Plant Protection Science. 38:29-35 (2002)
 Picard,K., Tirilly,Y. and Benhamou,N. (2000) Cytological effects of cellulases in the parasitism of Phytophthora parasitica by Pythium oligandrum. Appl.Environ.Microbiol., 66, 4305-4314. 
 Le Floch,G., Rey,P., Benizri,E., Benhamou,N. and Tirilly,Y. (2003) Impact of auxin-compounds produced by the antagonistic fungus Pythium oligandrum or the minor pathogen Pythium group F on plant growth. Plant Soil, 257, 459-470.
  

oligandrum